Fredrik Johansson (25 June 1974 – 25 January 2022) was a Swedish guitarist.

Biography
Johansson was a member of melodic death metal band Dark Tranquillity for almost six years. He joined  in 1993 after the band's vocalist at the time, Anders Fridén, left the band and their rhythm guitarist Mikael Stanne took the vocalist role to solely focus on it, leaving an empty rhythm guitarist spot, which Fredrik took. Prior to the release of Projector in 1999, he was asked to leave Dark Tranquillity due to a lack of commitment to the band, stemming from the fact that he wanted to become a family man.

There is a common misconception of him based on a shared name with another Swedish session guitarist from All Ends, who was actually the one to perform lead guitar on the In Flames song "December Flower" from the album The Jester Race.

Johansson died from cancer on 25 January 2022, at the age of 47.

Discography

Dark Tranquillity
Studio albums
The Gallery (1995)
The Mind's I (1997)
Projector (1999)

EPs
Of Chaos and Eternal Night EP (1995)
Enter Suicidal Angels EP (1996)

References

External links
 
 

1974 births
2022 deaths
Dark Tranquillity members
Dimension Zero (Swedish band) members
Male guitarists
Swedish heavy metal guitarists
Swedish male musicians
Musicians from Gothenburg
Place of death missing
Deaths from cancer in Sweden